Hanshang Subdistrict is a subdistrict in Hanjiang District, Yangzhou, Jiangsu, China. It is the most urbanized subdistrict in Hanjiang District. Transportation in Hanshang Subdistrict is convenient, with Yangzhou West Bus Station being located there. Hanshang Subdistrict is subdivided into Fengzhuang Community, Lanzhuang Community, Wuli Community, Jiaqiao Community and Wenchang Community.

References

Hanjiang District, Yangzhou
Township-level divisions of Jiangsu